The men's 1500 metres at the 2018 European Athletics Championships took place at the Olympic Stadium on 8 and 10 August.

Records

Schedule

Results

Round 1

First 3 (Q) and next 3 fastest (q) qualify for the final.

Final

References

1500 M
1500 metres at the European Athletics Championships